Nina Cried Power is the fourth extended play (EP) by the Irish musician Hozier. It was released on 7 September 2018. Its lead single "Nina Cried Power" featuring Mavis Staples is inspired by the legacies of artists like Nina Simone, Joni Mitchell, Billie Holiday, James Brown, Bob Dylan, Woody Guthrie, and Staples herself. The single was #1 on the Billboard Adult Alternative Songs airplay chart. The EP was Hozier's first new release since his 2014 self-titled debut album.

Recording
Booker T. Jones plays organ on the EP. It was produced by Markus Dravs and Rob Kirwan, who produced Hozier's debut.

Track listing

Charts

References

Hozier (musician) EPs
2018 EPs
Columbia Records EPs
Albums produced by Rob Kirwan
Albums produced by Markus Dravs